The Simla Agreement, also spelled Shimla Agreement, was a peace treaty signed between India and Pakistan on 2 July 1972 in Shimla, the capital city of the Indian state of Himachal Pradesh. It followed the Indo-Pakistani War of 1971, which began after India intervened in East Pakistan as an ally of Bengali rebels who were fighting against Pakistani state forces in the Bangladesh Liberation War. The Indian intervention proved decisive in the war and led to East Pakistan's breakaway from its union with West Pakistan and the emergence of the independent state of Bangladesh.

The treaty's official purpose was stated to serve as a way for both countries to "put an end to the conflict and confrontation that have hitherto marred their relations" and to conceive the steps to be taken for further normalization of India–Pakistan relations while also laying down the principles that should govern their future interactions.

Details of the Simla agreement 
The treaty was signed in Simla (also spelt "Shimla") in India by Zulfiqar Ali Bhutto, the President of Pakistan, and Indira Gandhi, the Prime Minister of India. The agreement also paved the way for diplomatic recognition of Bangladesh by Pakistan. Technically, the document was signed at 0040 hours in the night of 3 July; despite this official documents are dated 2 July 1972. Some of the major outcomes of the Simla Agreement are:
 Both countries will "settle their differences by peaceful means through bilateral negotiations". India has, many a times, maintained that Kashmir dispute is a bilateral issue and must be settled through bilateral negotiations as per Simla Agreement, 1972 and thus, had denied any third party intervention even that of United Nations.
 The agreement converted the cease-fire line of 17 December 1971 into the Line of Control (LOC) between India and Pakistan and it was agreed that "neither side shall seek to alter it unilaterally, irrespective of mutual differences and legal interpretations". Many Indian bureaucrats have later argued that a tacit agreement, to convert this LOC into international border, was reached during a one-on-one meeting between the two heads of government. However, Pakistani bureaucrats have denied any such thing. This identification of a new "cease-fire line" by both the states has been argued by India as making United Nations Military Observer Group in India and Pakistan insignificant. As according to India, the purpose of UNMOGIP was to monitor the cease-fire line as identified in Karachi agreement of 1949 which no longer exists. However, Pakistan have a different take on this issue and both countries still host the UN mission.

The agreement has not prevented the relationship between the two countries from deteriorating to the point of armed conflict, most recently in the Kargil War of 1999. In Operation Meghdoot of 1984 India seized all of the inhospitable Siachen Glacier region where the frontier had been clearly not defined in the agreement (possibly as the area was thought too barren to be controversial); this was considered as a violation of the Simla Agreement by Pakistan. Most of the subsequent deaths in the Siachen Conflict have been from natural disasters, e.g. avalanches in 2010, 2012, and 2016.

Text 
Simla Agreement on Bilateral Relations between India and Pakistan signed by Prime Minister Indira Gandhi, and President of Pakistan, Z. A. Bhutto, in Simla on 2 July 1972.

Delhi Agreement 

The Delhi Agreement on the Repatriation of War and Civilian Internees is a tripartite agreement among the aforementioned states, signed on 28 August 1973. The agreement was signed by Kamal Hossain, the Foreign Minister of the Government of Bangladesh, Sardar Swaran Singh, Minister of External Affairs of India and Aziz Ahmed, the Minister of State for Defense and Foreign Affairs of the Government of Pakistan.

See also
 India–Pakistan relations 
 Simla Accord (1914)

References

External links 

 Official Document of Simla Agreement

1972 in India
1972 in Pakistan
1974 in India
1974 in Pakistan
Government of Zulfikar Ali Bhutto
India–Pakistan relations
India–Pakistan treaties
Diplomacy regarding the Kashmir conflict
Shimla
Treaties concluded in 1972
Treaties concluded in 1974
Treaties involving territorial changes
Treaties of India
Treaties of Pakistan